Marie Bimenyimana (born 30 November 1996) is a Rwandan cricketer and the current captain of the Rwanda women's cricket team. She made her Women's Twenty20 International (WT20I) debut for the Rwanda on 26 January 2019, against Nigeria, in the first WT20I match of Rwanda's tour of Nigeria. It was the first WT20I match to be played by Rwanda.

In May 2019, she was named in Rwanda's squad for the 2019 ICC Women's Qualifier Africa tournament in Zimbabwe. In June 2019, she was named in Rwanda's squad for the 2019 Kwibuka Women's T20 Tournament in Rwanda. On 21 June 2019 she scored 114 not out against Mali, a score which was the first century for Rwanda Women in a WT20I match. In May 2021, she was named in Rwanda's squad for the 2021 Kwibuka Women's T20 Tournament in Rwanda. In August 2021, Bimenyimana replaced Sarah Uwera as the captain of the Rwandan team, ahead of the 2021 ICC Women's T20 World Cup Africa Qualifier tournament.

References

External links
 

1996 births
Living people
Rwandan women cricketers
Rwanda women Twenty20 International cricketers
Place of birth missing (living people)
Women cricket captains